Michael John Trought (born 19 October 1980) is an English former professional footballer, who played in The Football League for Bristol Rovers, and now plays for Southern League team Mangotsfield United.

Biography 
Trought, who was born in Bristol, started out as a trainee with Bristol Rovers and was promoted into their professional squad in 1998. He went on to make 33 League appearances in four years with The Pirates, before leaving to join Bath City in 2002. While still at Rovers he had a spell on loan at Clevedon Town in 2000.

Career 
In three seasons with Bath City he played 81 times in all competitions, scoring once, but his time there was frequently interrupted by minor injuries. He then went on to spend time with Backwell United, Clevedon Town and Paulton Rovers, before taking a brief break from the game. He returned to football in August 2009, when he joined Mangotsfield United.

Management
Trought gained some management experience early in his career, when he was appointed as manager of Sunday league side Bedminster Down–Cross Hands F.C. in 2000. He won promotion in each of his first two seasons with the club.

References

External links

1980 births
Living people
Footballers from Bristol
English footballers
Association football defenders
Bristol Rovers F.C. players
Clevedon Town F.C. players
Bath City F.C. players
Mangotsfield United F.C. players
Ashton & Backwell United F.C. players
Paulton Rovers F.C. players
English Football League players
Southern Football League players